Dendrobium section Phalaenanthe is a section of the genus Dendrobium.

Description
Plants in this section have compact stems with leaves at the apex and long arching inflorescence.

Distribution
Plants from this section are found in Australia and New Guinea.

Species
Dendrobium section Phalaenanthe comprises the following species:

Natural hybrids

References

Orchid subgenera